"Must Get Out" is a song by American band Maroon 5, taken from their debut album, Songs About Jane (2002). Written by the band members Adam Levine and Jesse Carmichael, and produced by Matt Wallace, the song was released as the fifth and final single from the album on April 5, 2005. A downtempo song, "Must Get Out" has a "dreamy" lyrical story about a tough period of a relationship. The song received mostly positive reviews from music critics, who praised Levine's vocals and the song's hook, considering it a highlight on the album. "Must Get Out" charted inside the top-ten in Netherlands, while reaching the top-forty in other three territories, including the United Kingdom – where it became the band's fifth top-forty hit. The song featured on Maroon 5's live album titled Live – Friday the 13th (2005). It is the only single of the album to have an official live music video.

Composition and lyrics 
"Must Get Out" was written by band members Adam Levine and Jesse Carmichael, while production and mixing was done by Matt Wallace. The song was written in the key of G major and set in a common time, with a tempo of 96 beats per minute. Levine's vocals on the song range from the low-note of G3 to the high note of B4. The band's guitarist James Valentine explained that the downtempo song emulates Andy Summers and The Police. Lyrically, "Must Get Out" expresses a tough period of a relationship, with a dreamy lyrical story, where the band "offers up clever imagery with 'I've been the needle and thread/Weaving figures eights and circles ‘round your head' and frank confessions to today's problems, 'The city's made us crazy and we must get out'."

Release and reception 
"Must Get Out" was selected as the album's fifth and final single from the album in Europe, being released on April 5, 2005. Its promotional single features the radio edit of the song, while the commercial single features the song and an acoustic version of the band's breakout hit "This Love". A released in the United Kingdom followed on April 11, 2005.

Critical 
"Must Get Out" received positive reviews from most music critics. In his review for the album, MacKenzie Wilson from Allmusic picked the song as a highlight, writing that the song "slows things down" and noted that "Levine is a vocal dead ringer for Men at Work's Colin Hay. Don't wince – it works brilliantly." Wayne Hoffman of Billboard also chose the song as a highlight, calling it "gentler". Robert Christgau also highlighted the track, writing: "Broken heart often spurs killer hooks, fond memories occasionally engender likable songs," citing "Must Get Out" as an example. Jason Thompson of PopMatters noted that Jesse Carmichael manages to conjure The New Radicals on the song, claiming that it is one of the "plenty of things [on the album] that could be hits." Meanwhile, Christian Hoard of Rolling Stone called it a "pretty, down-tempo" song that "sound[s] poised to mount an assault on [John] Mayer's college fan base."

Commercial
While not as successful as the other singles from the album, "Must Get Out" experienced moderate success in some European countries. In the Netherlands, the song proved to be one of the band's most successful singles from the album, only behind "This Love" and "She Will Be Loved", reaching number 8 and becoming the band's third top-10 hit. In Ireland and the United Kingdom, the song became another top-40 hit for the band, reaching numbers 34 and 39, respectively – in the UK in particular, the song was the band's fifth consecutive top-40 single. Likewise, in New Zealand, the song was their fifth top-40 single, though their least successful single on the charts, along with "Misery" (2010).

Live performances
Maroon 5 performed the track during their AOL Sessions, at the Top of the Pops and included the song on the 2005's CD/DVD Live – Friday the 13th. They performed the song on The Today Show on February 4, 2005. It was part of the encore on the "Songs About Jane Tour" and was last performed on the 2005 Honda Civic Tour.

Track listings

Charts

Weekly charts

Year-end charts

Release history

References

Maroon 5 songs
2002 songs
2005 singles
A&M Octone Records singles
J Records singles
Songs written by Adam Levine
Songs written by Jesse Carmichael